Im Kyu-tae (born January 6, 1981 in Seoul, South Korea) is a retired professional tennis player.

References

External links
 
 
 

Living people
South Korean male tennis players
1981 births
Tennis players from Seoul
Tennis players at the 2006 Asian Games
Doping cases in tennis
Asian Games competitors for South Korea
21st-century South Korean people